Goodwill, The Amity Group (founded as the Amity Association of Hamilton in 1935 by G. Vert Rayner, Jean Taggart, and T.H.L. Gallagher) is a non-profit social enterprise operating in the Hamilton and Halton regions of Ontario, Canada that helps people to overcome employment barriers and obtain employment.  As a member agency of Goodwill Industries International it operates a number of thrift stores selling donated clothing, housewares and other items to finance its social charity services.

History

Founding and The Great Depression 
Amity chose to make its first appearance in the fourth and worst year of the Great Depression, 1933. Despite the regular official pronouncements of recovery being imminent, there were no signs of improvement or even encouragement. The estimated number of unemployed people in Canada was 25%. In the Greater Hamilton area, 24,000 people were on relief within a population of 144,921.

The outward economic hardship of the time is somewhat easier to imagine than the accompanying, unseen hardship on the human spirit. For men who had supported themselves and their families through the prosperous 1920s without once having to consider a possible interruption of work and pay-pack, accepting Public Relief only certified their failure as providers. A whole family could feel the stigma. Children who wore clothing supplied by the Public Welfare Commission were sometimes taunted at school about the "Kappele boots", named after the welfare commissioner at the time.

The strain on local families soon became obvious to a local organization called the Family Welfare Bureau. Established in 1923, its original purpose has been to deal with the problem of broken homes resulting from the aftermath of the First World War. The clientele included families of husbands who never returned from the war, or who returned handicapped, or who were simply unable to find a job and the wives’ having to find work had created tensions. While the Bureau had provided assistance to 349 such families in its first year, by 1933 its focus had widened to assist all local families with whatever difficulties the may have had.

The most frequent problems heard by Jean McTaggart, the Bureau's executive director, came from the wives upset about the effect unemployment and inactivity was having on their husbands. She recalled the typical report of "…worries, unemployed husbands under their feet, and the sight of arguing, fist-waving men on the street corners…". The bureau, which tried to encourage self-help as an important part of its counselling, had already established knitting and sewing clubs for women. Following the rough outlines of a men's social club established in Winnipeg, the Bureau began a service club.

The project of forming the men's club was undertaken by T.H.L. "Shiner" Gallagher, President of the Family Welfare Bureau, and G. "Vert" Rayner, a businessman in the construction industry. With additional input from the Unemployment Recreation Committee, the Amity Men's social clubs were formed in early 1933. Vert Rayner supplied the name ‘Amity’, meaning friendship and goodwill.

The clubs were to be non-denominational and non-partisan, with the charter specifying that "controversial subjects are to be barred from discussion". The only common denominator these men required was that they were unemployed. Meetings and programs would be conducted by members themselves, with one member from the Family Welfare Bureau present to offer any assistance that was needed.

The first meeting took place on Monday, February 11, 1933. Seventy-five men attended St. James church hall that night and six other clubs would begin that week at St. Thomas’, St. John the Evangelist, Holy Trinity, All Saints Church, St. Luke's and St. Paul's Presbyterian.

The following week meetings at St. James’ Hall found more than 300 people in attendance, as the men had been invited to bring their wives along. The Hamilton Spectator reported that night's activities: "Following the usual ten minutes of community singing, there was a special program, including selections by a 12-piece orchestra, composed of club members. A special feature was the square-dancing for which old-time music was ‘fiddled’ by Capt. Galloway ... Mr. Pretzel donated three miniature aeroplanes, which he made and were drawn for. A most generous supply of ice cream was voluntarily donated by W. Growcock, local manager of William Neilson, Ltd."
The clubs, the Spectator concluded, "will undoubtedly appeal to the unemployed married men of the city and judging from the increased membership at each respective centre … the future will prove successful in providing amusement and entertainment to many who would otherwise be deprived of this type of wholesome recreation." Altogether 12 clubs were formed that year.

By that time, the clubs had grown to an average strength of 300 men at each branch. Local businessmen provided material assistance in whatever ways possible to help guarantee Amity's continuing. 1000 Boy Scouts took to the street for an apple day to raise funds for the clubs. Support also came from private subscribers, proceeds from a variety show at Wentworth Technical Institute and lottery drawings which the chief of police declared fine after investigating to calm suspicions they were actually a "housie-housie" game.

Gardens and toys 
In their monthly meetings, the Amity committee (now comprising 18 local businessmen) discussed what else the clubs could do to help themselves. The original threat unemployment posed to the substance of club-members' families, as well as the damage done to the men's self-respect, was still there. The board's answer was the garden plot scheme.

Development of local lots for housing had ground to a halt by the early 1930s, especially on Hamilton Mountain. Amity's plan was simple. After arranging temporary access to the lots—that would have been otherwise idle for the year—an initial outlay of $8,000 purchased seeds and supplies for gardening. Each lot was then assigned to one of the clubs, who in turn sectioned it off into individual gardent plots for each member and his family to cultivate with the seeds and tools provided to them.

Shiner Gallagher thinks of the community gardens as Amity's finest effort of the depression. The estimated number of families taking part grew from an original 6,000 to 8,000. The average harvest from a plot was estimated to be worth $25 of fresh vegetables. Eventually, the size of the project made it practical for the Chamber of Commerce to assume responsibility for its operations, with a number of Amity board members remaining on the advisory group.

The complete success of the community garden project encouraged the board and club members to consider other schemes that would help the unemployed to help themselves and not merely serve as a stop-gap relief.

In the winter of 1934, an occupational therapist at the Sanatorium contacted Jean McTaggart to enquire about the possibility of men making toys to donate for Christmas. The response was very positive. A garage was converted into a workshop with a couple of lathes as the most elaborate equipment; the Public Welfare Department supplied fuel for a Quebec heater. Other workshops were assembled in a summer kitchen and the basement of a store. Just before Christmas, some of the best pieces were displayed at a science room at McMaster University. For the men, it was an excellent opportunity to demonstrate that they still had useful skills and could produce something of value if given the opportunity.

The first workshop and store 
The board felt that the un-used talent displayed by the club members suggested the next possible route Amity should pursue. Jean McTaggart said the feeling was "the stage had been reached where some definite constructive project should be undertaken". In a meeting with representatives from the Family Service Bureau and the Public Welfare Dept., it was decided to try and create "practical employment on a non-profit basis..."

The form this took was a workshop at 7 Mary Street in Hamilton, directly across from the Century Theatre. The concept of the service-exchange was this; good furniture and other household articles in need of repair would be donated locally (the first Sunday, an appeal for donations was read by the minister of every church). If a club-member was interested in a sofa that would cost him the equivalent of 20-hours of work, that was how much labour he could put in at the workshop repairing any article. When the 20-hours was completed, the sofa was his to take home. For some, it was the first chance to provide material goods for themselves and their family, through their own labour in five years. Skills were also honed or developed as they worked under a qualified instructor.

Donations from the public exceeded all expectations, also creating a pleasant difficulty. There was only so much room to accommodate the workshop and the unfinished donated pieces' a surplus of finished pieces that had yet to be exchanged for hours worked was causing a definite space problem. Shiner Gallagher remembers walking in the doors and "you'd see the place packed, beautiful oak chairs hanging from rafters ..."

Larger quarters were needed. That September saw the social clubs disbanded and re-formed into one association, under an official charter. It had been decided that the surplus of finished goods would be sold and that Amity would expand to a new location at 18 Mary Street into a workshop and a storefront. There were open for business. When Amity moved into the second place on Mary Street, they found they needed a truck. Mr. C.S. Wilcox, President of Stelco met with Shiner and Shiner told him they were looking for a truck and that he would like to have him back a credit note for the purchase while we raised the money. Wilcox said, "most certainly". He was very surprised when the note was paid-off and offered more money when they need it to ask.

The final records for 1935 show that through the service exchange, over 500 families received approximately 1100 pieces of furniture.

Shiner Gallagher felt that the opening of the store was Amity's overall major achievement. "The benefits were two-fold -- club members were given work which let them provide something for their family. As well, the public was given a supply of good, inexpensive merchandise". There would be some controversy arising as to the propriety of a non-profit group offering more than competitive prices, but as Vert Rayner repeatedly pointed out, "the majority of the people using the store are people of limited means; but even if this were not so, anyone thrifty enough to purchase goods second-hand should be encouraged. As to competition with other stores, if anybody is able to save money by patronizing our store, other stores will reap the benefit of the saving."

By September 1936, Amity was also collecting and refurbishing clothing, shoes and other materials such as rags, etc., all donations to Amity were handled through a self-run system. Paper bags for donations were distributed to 6,000 Hamilton households. When the bag had been filled, a call to "BAker 1893" brought the Amity truck to collect. At the workshop, the donations were sifted, fumigated, sorted and distributed to one of the departments. At the time, there was laundry, sewing, shoe-repair, electrical, clock departments, and the carpenter shop. Waste paper and rags were handled, graded, baled by hand and prepared for shipment to the paper mills.

The cash-flow generated by the store's sales permitted Amity to offer pay packets to its workers. In November 1936, 33 workers received a total of $943 in wages. The services exchange was still popular as well, with 23 workers putting in a total of 533 hours for 73 articles needed in their homes. That month alone, seven families were able to quit city relief and become entirely self-supporting.

Amity's story through the next few years was one of sustained growth. 1937 saw a payroll of $13,600 to people who would have otherwise been unemployed. In 1938, the totals climbed to an even $15,000 in wages, with 750 families benefitting through the service exchange.

The war effort 
By September 1939, the psychological and economic effects of the Depression had lessened somewhat, but it was not until Canada went to war that unemployment was no longer the major concern.

When the Armed Forces became the single largest employer in Canada and war-related industries in Hamilton were working full shifts it appeared that Amity had outlived its original purpose.

The Board didn't agree. The original attempt had always been to help the needy. It was felt that there was a current social need that required assistance and was particularly well-suited to Amity's capabilities.

War charities were greatly in need of funds. Entering into a partnership with the Junior Chamber of Commerce, Amity returned to collecting discarded materials, but this time as a profit business. All proceeds were turned over to the Hamilton branch of the Red Cross Society and the Hamilton Citizens' Committee for War Services, The National War Services Dept. and its Dominion Salvage campaign did not commence until April 1941.

The importance of salvage was not so much that there was a shortage of raw materials in Canada but that it helped prevent a serious imbalance in the area of foreign exchange. At the time the Dominion was importing $10 million worth of scrap iron and steel, $4 million worth of rags and about $1 million worth of waste paper.

1941 was a particularly opportune time for Amity to move to its new home. Joseph Pigott and H.P. Frid, two local construction men and long-time Amity advisers arranged the purchase of the old McPherson Shoe Factory at the corner of John and Jackson Streets in Hamilton Ontario. The cost of the four storey building was $25,000. Other members of the business community lent their time and effort in renovating and preparing the new workshop. Besides most of the local construction industries donating labour and supplies, representatives from everyone from Eatons to Canadian Canners took part.

Amity's staff doubled that year, with 34 paid workers and from 10 to 15 worker-volunteers each night. Hundreds volunteered overall, driving collection trucks, sorting materials and repairing goods for resale. Ten to 20 men a week volunteered in the paint shop and local businesses loaned their trucks for night-time collections. Each neighbourhood was divided up into districts, donations were now picked up on a different day during the month for each district. The goods were left at the curb-side.

In less than two years, Amity donated $26,000 to the Red Cross, strictly from salvage and reconditioning, and hundreds of tons of scrap metals were supplied to the war industries.

The Red Cross voluntarily withdrew from its share of the proceeds in October 1942, so that other local ware services could receive their equitable share. Amity helped finance concerts for local camps and Christmas parties for servicemen's families.

The salvage campaign soon became known to its federal counterpart. Visitors from all parts of Canada were sent to study Amity's system of collection and processing, resulting in similar operations appearing across the country, call at the time "superfluity shops".

As the war drew to a close, Amity was ten years old. The Minister of National War Services, the Hon. L.R. Lafleche cited Amity for its quality salvage performance. He thanked the association for "the assurance that the vital contributions will continue thru-out the war".

The head of the American waste paper salvage wrote, "we have come to recognize Amity as the most efficient example of a salvage operation in Canada".

At war's end, Amity had donated $65,000 to war charities. They had a 4-story warehouse and workshop at peak efficiency and 37 full-time staff. For the second time in seven years, the main question was, what could they do next.

Helping handicapped people 
In 1955, Jackie Truckel found out he would not be able to complete Grade 12 at Cathedral High School, because the classes would take place in different rooms (on different floors) of the building, and not just in his home-room on the main floor. This was a serious obstacle for Jackie because he had cerebral palsy. He had to leave school.

The special placement office of the National Employment office told him that since he had no marketable skills there was really nothing they could do for him. However, the counsellor did mention an organization named Amity that he might want to contact. "I knew they did some work with the handicapped, but that was about it", Jack said of whatever associations he had of Amity at the time.

Jack Truckel soon appeared at the John Street workshop and met with the director and manager of the store. He told them he was interested in becoming a switchboard operator and they told him he could have an opportunity at that.

Jack was with Amity for the next three years, competing his training in switchboard operation. He also served as dispatcher for Amity's truck fleet, "and did everything there was to do in the office", such as inventory, preparing stock and merchandising reports

In 1959, Jack found a job as a taxi dispatcher. Shortly after that, he started a full-time job at the switchboard of Stelco.

The board of Amity felt that the plight of handicapped people was a genuine crisis that needed positive action. Outside of the fleeting attention generated by the handicapped veterans returning from overseas, the public was simply not as aware of the dilemma. As one member of the Board conceded, "there is a vast difference between an economic crisis which made its own publicity and the present day quiet but persistent problems of helping the physically handicapped. There is a difference in publicity between unemployment affecting thousands, and physical handicaps affecting hundreds. The physically handicapped cannot cry out for help for themselves in such volume and numbers, as can a whole community faced with disaster". As Shiner Gallagher remembers, "a lot of the fellows coming back from the war were now handicapped... we though Amity could be more constructive concentrating on doing one thing well".

With a fully equipped factory and a proven system of salvaging and repairing, the board felt that with a few minor ramifications handicapped people could assume a productive position in the labour force. In February 1946, Amity underwent its last major change and became the Amity Rehabilitation Centre.

Whenever possible, Amity attempted to place handicapped supervisors in charge of its departments. Ivan Roper, who came to the workshop in 1946, eventually becoming production supervisor in 1957, arrived shortly after the changeover. he began in the carpentry shop, where "there were just three of us to start".

The problems that surfaced in adapting to a rehabilitative plant took different forms. "You had a fair number of minor injuries, cuts, with people not used to working with the machinery", Ivan remembered. The work-routine was another challenge. "You'd like to get them doing a certain task over and over again, to familiar with it. But what we worked on was dependent on what had been donated for us to work on".

In the first year of Amity Rehab Centre, the operating departments were Shoe Repair, Upholstery, Electrical Repair, Metal-work, Cabinet work (including custom work), Painting & Finishing, Sewing & Pressing. Outside of the workshop there were office and sales positions, such as elevator operator, store clerk and office worker. Eight trucks handled salvage. The challenge involved was to continue to provide training under sheltered workshop conditions and at the same time function as any other business, so that they could afford to continue their work. The main obligation was always to the welfare of handicapped people. A co-operative arrangement with the Hamilton Association of Occupational Therapy was established. A medical supervisor assessed the physical capabilities of each applicant, while a psychologist provided vocational guidance. Facilities for physio- and occupational therapy were available when recommended by the physician.

Trainees received $50 a month, which would increase according to productivity. The maximum workshop salary in 1946 was 45¢ an hour for a man and 37¢ for a woman. Staff totalled 65 that year, with 37 of those being handicapped. The first yearly report listed the breakdown of disabilities as

Sinche the training was to eventually enable the men and women in the program to step into a similar job in industry, it was all the more important that the equipment they worked with at Amity was reasonably up-to-date. Local businesses were again helpful donating their surplus equipment or simply supplying it out of goodwill. The association's goal was to continually expand the size and variety of training offered. The more trainees who were placed in outside jobs, the more vacancies Amity had to take on new trainees.

Amity's enthusiasm was reflected in the final report for 1948. Thiry handicapped persons were currently receiving training and $35,000 were paid in wages that year. Like any other business, Amity had to respond to changing economic conditions and some changes were required in the daily operations. It was decided that the curb-side collection, probably the most visible of Amity's activities since it began during the war, would be discontinued. The cost of the trucks' operations, with paid drivers instead of war-time volunteers, was prohibitive. As well, the fall-off in paper demand made its salvage unprofitable. The majority of Amity's more valuable donated items were usually phoned in to the office requesting a collection, rather than being included in the curb-side donation.

Dr. George Davidson, then the deputy-minister of Health and Welfare lauded Amity as the only such organization of its kind operating in Canada. Other workshops were in the business of retraining the physically handicapped, but the training was not meant to extend beyond that particular program.

Success stories: assessment and placement 
A combination of a drop in scrap prices and a coincidental decline in sales prompted some concern in 1949 when Amity had to negotiate a bank loan of $25,000 to meet its financial obligations. The store had to sell $20,000 just pay for trucks and help. Other expenses had risen as well as then-President John Ostler explained, "Our available cash reserves were completely used up in providing adequate fire exit facilities for the handicapped employed". Amity came on hard times after the war and the bank wanted to restrict Amity's borrowing, so Shiner went to the Synod of the Diocese of Niagara and asked them to back a mortgage of $25,000. They came and looked at the building and what we were doing and said "yes". We then got in a manager, Mr. Oliver, and he completely turned things around at Amity and paid off the mortgage within 2–3 years.

The importance of having an efficient escape system in place was an ever-present concern with the management, with over 50% of the workers in the building being handicapped. There had been a boiler explosion earlier in the year, which though spectacular, (blowing the windows out, punching a hole in the main floor and staircase), miraculously caused no serious injuries with only the engineer requiring hospitalization for burns.

The true success stories of Amity were, as always, the trainees.

Dino Pacenti was a construction worker in 1946 when he was diagnosed with tuberculosis. After a year and half at the Hamilton Mountain Sanatorium, he was pronounced cured, but told that he could never perform heavy labour again. After eight months as a trainee at Amity learning shoe repair, Dino was able to leave and establish his own shop.

George Operman became a chair caner after two years as an instructor with Amity. "Few people know what wonderful work is being done at Amity", he said. "It's amazing how much help is provided handicapped people who would otherwise be dependent on government assistance".

Shiner Gallagher concurs with the observation on public awareness of Amity. "Around this time we decided to send someone down to the corner of King and James Streets, to politely ask passers-by what they knew about Amity. And the majority of the ones who knew anything about Amity answered, 'War salvage'".

To most people Amity was just "that second-hand store with all the unusual stuff". People remembered walking into a showroom that at one time included a black pot-belly stove with nickel overlay, a 124-year-old rope string bed, the occasional abacus and an antique "Wanzer" sewing machine (manufactured in Hamilton before the turn of the century) and an even more aged typewriter with the 'invisible' roll, typing unseen in the innards of the machine. As much as Amity appreciated and needed the commercial traffic, the directors despaired at the less than full understanding the public had of where the merchandise they bought came from, or what kind of services their purchase money helped to cover. When one customer actually appeared at the store manager's office with a quite vocal suspicion of where Amity's 'profits' were going, the store manager gladly took the cynical visitor on a full tour of the building, from the loading dock through every workshop and out onto the sales floor.

By the early 1950s it was calculated that Amity had paid out more than half a million dollars in wages to needy and indigent people over the course of its young existence.

Enough people were aware and supportive enough to keep donations coming in and people working. In 1995 the Rehabilitation Centre entered into a partnership with the Institute Physical Medicine and Rehabilitation, an organization that conducted the most detailed assessments to that time on the overall needs of the handicapped. The institute kept a file open on each of the people it referred to Amity, after first making its suggestions on what type of work the person was most suited for. The file remained open until the trainee was placed in a permanent job.

The trainees were sponsored by the provincial government through the welfare department, with the training period running anywhere from four months to a year, depending on the individual's progress. Room and board plus transportation money to and from Amity were paid for by the government. Individual progress reports were compiled by Amity for the government.

Towards the end of the course, the trainee was listed with the National Employee Service Selective Department. "In most cases", Amity Director Peter Ross said, "we can safely reckon that the person will be suitably placed in a job from which both he and the employer will benefit". No books or class lectures were given in training as it was felt that some of the trainees lacked educational ability and that this was one of the reasons that they were training with Amity.

One thing Peter Ross felt compelled to comment on at the time was the positive psychological effect that the centre seemed to have on both trainees and staff. "It is something that cannot be measured but it is really great".

"The disabled people seem to work better as a group", Ross continued. "I suppose that it's mainly because when they work with others who are also physically disabled, they are unconscious of their own handicap".

A list was compiled of firms willing to accept handicapped people (when openings occurred). At the time, these were mostly small industries, with four to six employees. One other project of Amity's was to try to educate the larger firms on the practicality and reliability of hiring handicapped people.

Shortly after beginning his switchboard career with one large company that obviously would hire the disabled, Jack Trucket said, "I firmly believe a handicapped person will be a better worker because he knows he has to hold the job. Other people can quit their jobs and go get another right away. But I know I can't go across the street to work for someone else, just like that".

References

Further reading
Places of Caring, 1985 by Guy Jones

Non-profit organizations based in Ontario